RE/Search No. 10: Incredibly Strange Films is a book about American underground and other films. It was guest edited by Jim Morton, with associate editor Boyd Rice, in the RE/Search series edited by V. Vale and Andrea Juno, originally published in 1985 and expanded in 1986.

Among the subjects covered are the work of filmmakers Russ Meyer, Herschell Gordon Lewis, Frank Henenlotter, Larry Cohen, Doris Wishman, David F. Friedman, Ed Wood, Radley Metzger, Joseph W. Sarno, Ray Dennis Steckler, Ted V. Mikels, Dick Bakalyan,  and genres such as women in prison film, mondo films, exploitation films, beach party films, Santo films, educational films, LSD films, juvenile delinquent films, biker films, and sexploitation films. It includes essays on Young Playthings, Wizard of Gore, God Told Me To, Blast of Silence, Daughter of Horror, Spider Baby, and George Romero.

The book was published in the US by RE/Search Publications and in Britain by Plexus.

References

 RE/Search No. 10: Incredibly Strange Films. San Francisco: RE/Search Publications, 1986. .
 Incredibly Strange Films. London: Plexus, n.d. .

External links
RE/Search No. 10: Incredibly Strange Films, researchpubs.com.
 Audio interview with co-editor Jim Morton

1986 books
Books about film